Wola Sękowa  (Volia Sen’kova) is a village in East Małopolska in the Bukowsko Upland mountains, Bukowsko rural commune, parish in Bukowsko.

It is situated below the main watershed at the foot of the Słonne Mountain, and has an elevation of 340 metres. It is located in the Subcarpathian Voivodship (since 1999), previously in Krosno Voivodship (1975–1998) and Sanok district, ( east of Sanok). Nearby towns include Medzilaborce and Palota (in northeastern Slovakia). The village lies near the Pielnica River at the foot of the Bukowica mountains, which are the main trail in Pogórze Bukowskie.

Hiking trails
European walking route E8

Literature
 Prof. Adam Fastnacht.  Slownik Historyczno-Geograficzny Ziemi Sanockiej w Średniowieczu (Historic-Geographic Dictionary of the Sanok District in the Middle Ages), Kraków, 2002, .

External links
 Wola Sekowa
 Wola Piotrowa
 Caritas in Zboiska
 Castle in Zboiska

Villages in Sanok County